The Deskstar was the name of a product line of computer hard disk drives. It was originally announced by IBM in October 1994. The line was continued by Hitachi when in 2003 it bought IBM's hard disk drive division and renamed it Hitachi Global Storage Technologies. In 2012 Hitachi sold the division to Western Digital who continued the drive product line brand as HGST Deskstar. In 2018 Western Digital began winding down the HGST brand and as of 2020 it is defunct.

The first Deskstar product produced by IBM was the DALA-3540; the last was the 180GXP HGST continued the product line after the acquisition, selling the Deskstar 120GXP and Deskstar 180GXP under the HGST brand for a short time and selling new models thereafter.

The unreliable IBM Deskstar 75GXP product became notorious as the "Deathstar" (only one of at least twenty IBM products in the Deskstar family).

Products
A list of Deskstar models, including all those manufactured by IBM and HGST while under Hitachi's management.

IBM models

HGST models under Hitachi management

HGST models under WD management
The nine current models in production at WD's acquisition of HGST continued to be offered.  The Deskstar 7K1000.C was the last model offered by HGST.

IBM Deskstar 75GXP failures

The IBM Deskstar 75GXP (six models ranging in capacity from 15 to 75 GB) became infamous circa 2001 for their reportedly high failure rates, which led to the drives being colloquially referred to as "Deathstar". Due to this, the drives were ranked 18th in PC World's "Worst Tech Products of All Time" feature in 2006. Note the simultaneously announced IBM Deskstar 40GV, a 5400 RPM version of the 7200 RPM 75GXP, did not suffer from the same reported high failure rate.

Lawsuit
Despite failures being reported within the manufacturer warranty period of three years, Michael T. Granito, Jr., an American user of IBM's 75GXP hard drives, filed a class-action lawsuit against IBM on 16 October 2001 for defects in the product causing it to "crash", with both of the drives he had bought having failed within a short time. IBM was found to have misled its customers about the reliability of the drives. Without admitting responsibility, they settled this lawsuit in 2005, agreeing to pay $100 to every user whose Deskstar 75GXP drives had failed.  The settlement related to the following family of IBM Deskstar 75GXP HDD models: DTLA 307-015; DTLA 307-020; DTLA 307-030; DTLA 307-045; DTLA 307-060; DTLA 307-075; the Deskstar 40GV was not included in the litigation.

Details
The drives were known for an unusually high rate of head crashes, due to the magnetic coating soon beginning to loosen and sprinkle off from the platters, creating dust in the hard disk array and leading to crashes over large areas of the platters. The combination of two technologies, GMR (Giant Magneto-Resistive) heads on 3.5-inch glass platters, are said to be largely to blame for the issues.

A firmware update introduced wear levelling which avoids the heads dwelling too long over the same area thereby reducing the potential for head crashes.  The same firmware update also fixed a possible data corruption due to a problem with S.M.A.R.T. background operations.

Aftermath
After the filing of the lawsuit, IBM unveiled the Deskstar 120GXP, and the Travelstar 60GH and 40GN on November 7, 2001. The Deskstar documentation was updated to show that the drives had been rated to 333 power-on hours per month (45 percent), leading to speculation that this was the result of the lawsuit. However, an IBM spokesperson replied that the rating was not new at the time.

See also
 Travelstar
 Ultrastar

References

External links
 Official HGST Deskstar Page
 IBM Deskstar 75GXP Class Action Website on the Internet Archive
 Dead deathstar dissected The loss of recording layer from the glass platters is clearly shown.

Divested IBM products
Hard disk drives
Hitachi
IBM storage devices
Western Digital products